Wintersville is a village in central Jefferson County, Ohio. The population was 3,609 as of the 2020 Census. It is part of the Weirton–Steubenville metropolitan area. The village is suburban in nature and is governed by a mayor and council elected by non-partisan ballot.

History
The first settlement at Wintersville was made in 1831. The village was named for its founder, John Winters. A post office was established at Wintersville in 1831, and remained in operation until 1901.

During Morgan's Raid, a Union victory in the Civil War in 1863, Confederate Brid. Gen. John Hunt Morgan 
traveled through the Moorefield, Harrisville, New Athens, 
Smithfield, New Alexandria, Wintersville, Two Ridge, 
Richmond, East Springfield, Bergholz, and Monroeville 
on his way to defeat at the Battle of Salineville.

Geography
Wintersville is located at  (40.377190, -80.706510).

In addition to a direct highway system, Wintersville is strategically located 30 miles from the Greater Pittsburgh International Airport, 20 miles from the Wheeling-Ohio County Airport, and abuts the Jefferson County Airport on its south corporate line. River and rail transportation are available along the Ohio River.

Demographics

2010 census
As of the census of 2010, there were 3,924 people, 1,740 households, and 1,083 families living in the village. The racial makeup of the village was 91.4% White, 6.4% African American, 0.1% Native American, 0.8% Asian, 0.1% from other races, and 1.1% from two or more races. Hispanic or Latino of any race were 0.9% of the population.

There were 1,740 households, of which 23.6% had children under the age of 18 living with them, 47.1% were married couples living together, 10.7% had a female householder with no husband present, 4.4% had a male householder with no wife present, and 37.8% were non-families. 34.0% of all households were made up of individuals, and 18.4% had someone living alone who was 65 years of age or older. The average household size was 2.20 and the average family size was 2.79.

The median age in the village was 48.8 years. 17.8% of residents were under the age of 18; 6.7% were between the ages of 18 and 24; 20% were from 25 to 44; 30.6% were from 45 to 64; and 24.9% were 65 years of age or older. The gender makeup of the village was 46.8% male and 53.2% female.

2000 census
As of the census of 2000, there were 4,067 people, 1,743 households, and 1,188 families living in the village. The population density was 1,154.4 people per square mile (446.1/km). There were 1,802 housing units at an average density of 511.5 per square mile (197.7/km). The racial makeup of the village was 92.82% White, 6.02% African American, 0.02% Native American, 0.20% Asian, 0.02% from other races, and 0.91% from two or more races. Hispanic or Latino of any race were 0.57% of the population.

There were 1,743 households, out of which 23.2% had children under the age of 18 living with them, 54.9% were married couples living together, 9.6% had a female householder with no husband present, and 31.8% were non-families. 29.4% of all households were made up of individuals, and 14.6% had someone living alone who was 65 years of age or older. The average household size was 2.26 and the average family size was 2.78.

In the village, the population was spread out, with 18.4% under the age of 18, 6.6% from 18 to 24, 25.4% from 25 to 44, 28.4% from 45 to 64, and 21.2% who were 65 years of age or older. The median age was 45 years. For every 100 females there were 93.4 males. For every 100 females age 18 and over, there were 89.5 males.

The median income for a household in the village was $35,330, and the median income for a family was $46,190. Males had a median income of $38,125 versus $20,969 for females. The per capita income for the village was $18,941. About 3.7% of families and 6.9% of the population were below the poverty line, including 7.1% of those under age 18 and 3.6% of those age 65 or over.

Education
Public education in the village of Wintersville is provided by the Indian Creek Local School District. The district also serves the villages of Bloomingdale and Mingo Junction, the far western portion of Steubenville as well as unincorporated areas in central Jefferson County. Campuses serving the village include Wintersville Elementary School (Preschool-Grade 4), Hills Elementary School (Preschool-Grade 4), Indian Creek Junior High School (Grades 5–8), and Indian Creek High School (Grades 9-12).

References

External links
 Village website

Villages in Jefferson County, Ohio
Villages in Ohio